David Richmond Gergen (born May 9, 1942) is an American political commentator and former presidential adviser who served during the administrations of Richard Nixon, Gerald Ford, Ronald Reagan, and Bill Clinton. He is currently a senior political analyst for CNN and a professor of public service and the founding director of the Center for Public Leadership at the Harvard Kennedy School. Gergen is also the former editor at large of U.S. News & World Report and a contributor to CNN.com and Parade Magazine. He has twice been a member of election coverage teams that won Peabody awards—in 1988 with MacNeil–Lehrer, and in 2008 with CNN.

Gergen joined the Nixon White House in 1971, as a staff assistant on the speech-writing team, becoming director of speechwriting two years later. He served as director of communications for both Ford and Reagan, and as a senior adviser to Clinton and Secretary of State Warren Christopher. He graduated with honors from Yale and Harvard Law School, and has been awarded 27 honorary degrees.

Early life
David Gergen was born in Durham, North Carolina, to John Jay Gergen, the chairman of the mathematics department at Duke University from 1937 to 1966, and Aubigne Munger (née Lermond). He is the youngest of four children, and one of his brothers, Kenneth J. Gergen, is a psychologist and professor at Swarthmore College. One of his other brothers was Stephen L. Gergen.

Education
Gergen was educated at Durham High School, a former public high school in his hometown of Durham, North Carolina, where he edited the school newspaper, Hi-Rocket. After high school graduation, he went to Yale University, from which he earned his B.A. degree in American studies in 1963, and was a member of the Manuscript Society. At Yale, he was managing editor of the Yale Daily News, whose staff at the time included future senator Joe Lieberman, Stephen Bingham, Robert G. Kaiser, and Paul Steiger. Gergen received his LL.B. degree from Harvard Law School in 1967 and married Anne Elizabeth Gergen, a native of London, England, the same year.

Life and career

For three summers, Gergen was an intern in the office of North Carolina Governor Terry Sanford, where he became deeply involved in civil rights efforts. Gergen has called this work his “most satisfying experience in public service.” He served in the U.S. Navy for three-and-a-half years and was stationed on a ship home-ported in Japan. Gergen writes in his book of his time as a damage control officer on a repair ship, USS Ajax: “Learning to control damage, it turned out, was the best possible preparation for my coming years in the White House”.

Political activity
Gergen began his political career in 1971 when he went to work for Richard Nixon as a staff assistant in the speech-writing office headed by Ray Price—a group that included Pat Buchanan, Ben Stein, and William Safire. Two years later, he rose to director of speechwriting.

In 1974 Gergen took a brief hiatus from the White House to write speeches for Treasury Secretary William E. Simon. Gergen writes in his book, "For me it was a great trade—the Treasury team taught me all about free markets and fiscal discipline." Gergen returned to the White House in 1975 as director of communications for President Gerald Ford. In 1980, Gergen was an adviser to the George H. W. Bush presidential campaign and went on to join the Reagan White House in 1981. Beginning as a staff director, he eventually became director of communications. In 1993 Gergen returned to the White House, serving as counselor to President Bill Clinton and Secretary of State Warren Christopher.

Journalism
Currently, Gergen is a senior political analyst for CNN and often appears on Anderson Cooper 360 and Erin Burnett OutFront.

Following his years in public service, Gergen worked as a political journalist, commentator, and editor. After leaving the White House in 1977, he worked as a freelance writer and, in 1978, as the first managing editor of Public Opinion, a magazine published by the American Enterprise Institute. From 1985 to 1986, he worked as an editor at U.S. News & World Report, where he became editor at large following his service in the Clinton administration. There, he worked with publisher Mort Zuckerman to achieve record gains in circulation and advertising.

Gergen's career in television began in 1985, when he joined the MacNeil/Lehrer NewsHour for Friday night discussions of politics, where he remained a regular commentator for five years.

Currently, in addition to CNN, he has been a frequent guest on NPR and CBS’ Face the Nation. He has written for Parade Magazine and has been published in an array of other publications including The New York Times and Newsweek.

Twice he has been a member of election coverage teams that won Peabody awards in 1988 with MacNeil/Lehrer Newshour, and in 2008 with CNN.

Academia
Gergen taught at Duke University from 1995 to 1999 and then joined the Harvard University faculty in 1999. He is currently a professor of public service at the Harvard Kennedy School, where he teaches courses on leadership, public service, and U.S. politics. During election years, he co-teaches a course called Contemporary Issues in American Elections with Elaine Kamarck. In January 2014 he taught a Harvard short-term course in New York City titled "Leadership for a Livable City."

At Harvard Kennedy School, he served as the co-director of the Kennedy School Center for Public Leadership, which seeks to enhance leadership teaching and research. The Center helps to provide scholarships to 100 fellows a year, preparing them to serve as leaders for the common good.

Gergen served as the inaugural Isabella Cannon Distinguished Visiting Professor of Leadership at Elon University and was a fellow at Harvard University's Institute of Politics in 1984.

Books
Gergen is the author of the New York Times bestseller book Eyewitness to Power: The Essence of Leadership, Nixon to Clinton, published in 2000. The book recounts his time in the Nixon, Ford, Reagan, and Clinton administrations. Gergen argues that, as the 21st century begins, the success of the United States as a country will depend heavily upon the success of a new generation in power. Drawing upon his many experiences in the White House, he offers seven vital elements that future leaders must possess: inner mastery; a central, compelling purpose rooted in moral values; a capacity to persuade; an ability to work within the system; a sure, quick start; strong, prudent advisers; and a passion that inspires others to carry on the mission.  In 2022, Gergen was working on a new book about renewing America's political culture.  His 2nd book, Hearts Touched with Fire: How Great Leaders are Made, was published in May 2022.

Personal life
Gergen has been married since 1967 to Anne Elizabeth Gergen, who is a family therapist. They live in Cambridge, Massachusetts, and have two children and five grandchildren. Their son, Christopher, is a social entrepreneur in North Carolina as well as an author and a member of the Duke University faculty. Their daughter, Katherine, is a family doctor, working with the underserved population at the Boston Medical Center.

Awards and memberships
Gergen has been active on many non-profit boards, and has served on the boards of Yale and Duke Universities. Among his current boards are Teach for America, City Year, Schwab Foundation, the Aspen Institute and the advisory board for the Harvard Graduate School of Education. He also chairs the advisory board for the new School of Law at Elon University. He is a member of the D.C. Bar, the Council on Foreign Relations, and the North American executive committee for the Trilateral Commission. Gergen has been awarded 27 honorary degrees.

Recent non-profit boards
Gergen is a member of the following non-profit boards:

 Aspen Institute
 Boston Museum Project
 Center for Global Development
 Center for the Study of the Presidency
 City Year
 The Mission Continues
 The National Campaign to Prevent Teen and Unplanned Pregnancy
 Morehouse College Leadership Institute
 Schwab Foundation for Social Enterprise,
 World Economic Forum
 Teach for America
 World Resources Institute
 Yale Corporation (former)

Advisory roles
He also serves as an advisor to the following groups:

 Chair, National Advisory Board, Elon University School of Law
 Co-Chair, Inclusive America Project, Aspen Institute
 Member, Advisory Board, Harvard Graduate School of Education
 Member, North American Executive Committee, Trilateral Commission
 Former Chair, National Selection Committee for Innovations in American Government
 Former Co-chair, National Selection Committee, Top American Leaders (co-sponsored by The Washington Post and Center for Public Leadership)
 Former Chair, Smithsonian's National Portrait Gallery Peck Presidential Awards (for service to the U.S. presidency)
 Member, Selection committees for Fast Companys Social Capitalist Awards (best social entrepreneurs, U.S.)
 Judge, Civic Venture Purpose Prize Awards (citizens over 60 creating social change)
 Judge, Gleitsman Awards

See also

 List of U.S. political appointments that crossed party lines

References

External links

 
 Harvard Kennedy School biography 

|-

|-

|-

1942 births
American political consultants
American political commentators
Speechwriters for presidents of the United States
Clinton administration personnel
CNN people
Counselors to the President
Duke University faculty
Elon University faculty
Ford administration personnel
Harvard Law School alumni
Harvard University faculty
Living people
Nixon administration personnel
Writers from Durham, North Carolina
Reagan administration personnel
United States Navy sailors
Lawyers from Washington, D.C.
White House Communications Directors
White House Staff Secretaries
Yale University alumni
Massachusetts Republicans
Massachusetts Independents
White House Directors of Speechwriting